Point of Know Return is the fifth studio album by American rock band Kansas, released in 1977. The album was reissued in remastered format on CD in 2002.

Composition and recording 
The recording sessions for Point of Know Return commenced in June 1977 at Studio in the Country, the Bogalusa, Louisiana facility where Kansas' precedent two albums were recorded: due to the band encountering equipment failure at Studio in the Country, Kansas shifted recording sites, the majority of the recording of Point of Know Return being done at Woodland Studios in Nashville over the month of July.

Singer/songwriter Steve Walsh left the group briefly during the recording of this album. In an interview on the weekly In the Studio with Redbeard radio show, he would admit that, at this point, he had been something of a prima donna and was attracted by the chance of a solo career.

"Dust in the Wind" is known for its sparse acoustic nature. The guitar line for the song was written by Kerry Livgren as a finger exercise for learning fingerpicking. His wife, Vicci, heard what he was doing, remarked that the melody was nice, and encouraged him to write lyrics for it. Livgren was unsure whether his fellow band members would like it, since it was a departure from their signature style. However he did offer it to them, and the song was accepted and then recorded.

The album is critically acclaimed for the singles "Point of Know Return," which was a late addition to the album, and "Portrait (He Knew)," which was written about Albert Einstein. In 1988, Livgren released an updated version of "Portrait (He Knew)" titled "Portrait II" as part of the album Prime Mover credited to his band AD. He changed the subject of the song from Einstein to Jesus Christ. Another song, "Closet Chronicles", is a Howard Hughes allegory.

Reception 

Rolling Stone gave the album a mixed review, saying that though the transition to shorter songs generally works, the lyrics are "a wan and ridiculous rehash of the bargain-basement exoticism employed by the British art-rock crowd." They commented that though Kansas lacks a virtuoso soloist, the band's ensemble playing is strong and purposeful. Robert Taylor of AllMusic wrote that Kansas' "interplay and superior musicianship make this both an essential classic rock and progressive rock recording", despite its "dated sound" and the band's struggle "to maintain a healthy balance of progression combined with pop."

Point of Know Return would be Kansas' highest-charting album in the US, peaking at No. 4 in January 1978, and would sell four million copies in the US and be certified Quadruple Platinum by the RIAA.

Cultural impact 

During a debate of greatest "Song 1 Side 1" in history among the lead characters in the movie High Fidelity, Jack Black's character criticizes one of John Cusack's character's proposals as "too obvious, like 'Point of Know Return'". The album cover has become an iconic image from the album rock era, appearing on the background of the set of VH1 Classic, on tee shirts worn by characters in movies and on TV, and in other places.

In October 2009, a live version of the title track was released as a downloadable add-on to the Harmonix video game Rock Band.

In the 2008 film The Rocker, Rainn Wilson's character Robert Fishman is seen wearing a Point of Know Return T-shirt.

"Nobody's Home" is sampled by rapper J Dilla on the song "So Far" on his 2016 posthumous release The Diary. However, the sample is from a cover version rather than the Kansas recording.

"Dust in the Wind" was also used in the Highlander: The Series episode "The Darkness" (season 2, episode 4), in which Duncan MacLeod is reliving his memories of Tessa Noel after her death.

The 2021 film The Suicide Squad features the song "Point of Know Return" playing from a minor character's portable radio.

Track listing 

The remix of "Portrait (He Knew)" in the 2002 remastered edition marks the third time the song has been remixed. A remix appeared on the original single. A different remix appeared on the bonus disc of a Europe-only collection from the late 1990s.

Personnel 
Kansas
 Steve Walsh – organ, synthesizers, vibraphone, piano, lead vocals (except on "Lightning's Hand"), backing vocals, additional percussion
 Kerry Livgren – synthesizers, piano, clavinet, electric and acoustic guitars, additional percussion
 Robby Steinhardt – violins, viola, backing vocals, lead vocals on "Closet Chronicles", "Lightning's Hand", "Sparks of the Tempest", and "Hopelessly Human"
 Rich Williams – electric and acoustic guitars
 Dave Hope – bass
 Phil Ehart – drums, timpani, chimes, additional percussion

Note: The album's performing credits listed one joke "instrument" for each band member, such as "chain-driven gong", "autogyro", "Rinaldo whistling machine", and "Peabody chromatic inverter".

Production
 Jeff Glixman – producer, engineer, mixing at Village Recorders, Los Angeles, August 1977, remastered edition producer
 Terry Diane Becker – additional engineering
 George Marino – mastering at Sterling Sound, New York, September 1977
 Kansas – arrangements and cover art concept
 Tom Drennon – art director
 Peter Lloyd – cover painting
 Rod Dyer – inner sleeve design
 Bob Maile – calligraphy
 Jeff Magid – remastered edition producer

Charts 
 

Album

Singles

Certifications

References 

Kansas (band) albums
1977 albums
Albums produced by Jeff Glixman
Epic Records albums
Legacy Recordings albums
Albums recorded at Studio in the Country